Diploon is a genus of plant in the family Sapotaceae described as a genus in 1946.

There is only  one known species, Diploon cuspidatum, native to South America (Brazil, Venezuela, Guyana, Bolivia, Peru, Ecuador).

References

Monotypic Ericales genera
Chrysophylloideae
Sapotaceae genera
Flora of South America
Taxa named by Arthur Cronquist